Dinking may refer to;

 Dinking, a manufacturing process used in die cutting
 Dinking, the act of performing a dink, and a learned skill, in various sports including:
 Footvolley
 Pickleball
 Soccer
 Tennis
 Volleyball

See also
 Dink (disambiguation)
 Dinker (disambiguation)
 Drinking